The Old Neighborhood could refer to: 

The Old Neighborhood (book), a 1999 non-fiction book by Ray Suarez
The Old Neighborhood (play), a 1997 play by David Mamet

See also
Old Neighborhoods Historic District, a national historic district located at Lexington, Lafayette County, Missouri